Nikolay Kudryavtsev is rector at Moscow Institute of Physics and Technology.

Career
Nikolay Kudryavtsev graduated from the Department of Molecular and Chemical Physics of the Moscow Institute of Physics and Technology in 1973.  He received his Ph.D. in physics and mathematics from the same institute in 1977. Dr. Kudryavtsev worked at MIPT in various positions including Molecular Physics Chair and dean of the Department of Molecular and Chemical Physics. He became professor in 1990. Since June 1997 he serves as rector at Moscow Institute of Physics and Technology. In 2007 he was elected to Schlumberger Board of Directors.  Professor Kudryavtsev is a member of the Russian Academy of Sciences.

In 2022, he signed the Address of the Russian Union of Rectors, which called to support Putin in his invasion of Ukraine.

References

See also
 web site
Moscow Institute of Physics and Technology 
Russian Academy of Sciences 
Schlumberger

Russian physicists
Corresponding Members of the Russian Academy of Sciences
Moscow Institute of Physics and Technology alumni
Academic staff of the Moscow Institute of Physics and Technology
1950 births
Living people